Van Drunen or VanDrunen is a surname. Notable people with the surname include:

David M. VanDrunen (born 1971), American theologian
David Van Drunen (born 1976), Canadian ice hockey player
Martin van Drunen (born 1966), Dutch heavy metal musician and singer

Surnames of Dutch origin